Vinaya Chakradeo is an Indian otolaryngologist and academic. Chakradeo obtained her medical degree from B J Medical College Pune in 2000. Her work mostly revolves around robotic approaches to ENT resolutions. Chakradeo is affiliated to Geisinger Medical Center Danville, Pennsylvania and Geisinger Wyoming Valley Medical Center Wilkes-Barre, Pennsylvania. Chakradeo founded ENT Foundation that extends better ENT services to rural patients in India.

Publications 

 Robotics in Otolaryngology, Head & Neck Surgery 
 Vascular anatomy of anterolateral thigh flap 
 Navigational Surgery with Voice: Controlled Robotic Assist for Endoscopic Approach to the Pituitary
 The Voice-Controlled Robotic Assist Scope Holder AESOP for the Endoscopic Approach to the Sella

References 

Indian otolaryngologists
People from Pune
Year of birth missing (living people)
Living people